The Provincial Court of Newfoundland and Labrador is the lower trial court of the Canadian province of Newfoundland and Labrador. It hears cases relating to criminal law and family law.

Judges of the Provincial Court are appointed by the provincial cabinet, on recommendation of the Attorney General.

Judges of the Provincial Court of Newfoundland and Labrador

Current Judges

Supernumerary or Per Diem

See also
 Judicial appointments in Canada
 Supreme Court of Newfoundland and Labrador
 Court of Appeal of Newfoundland and Labrador

References

External links
 The Provincial Court of Newfoundland and Labrador website

Newfoundland and Labrador courts

Newfoundland_and_Labrador